The North American Pairs (NAP) is a set of annual North American championships for  contested over two days at the spring American Contract Bridge League (ACBL) North American Bridge Championships (NABC). The events are restricted to pairs that have qualified through local, regional and district levels within their ACBL Districts. 

Three fields or "Flights" compete on the same schedule:
 Flight A, open to all players, is formally the Baldwin North American Pairs.
 Flight B, restricted to players with 0 to 2500 masterpoints, is formally the Golder North American Pairs.
 Flight C, restricted to players who have not yet become Life Masters and have fewer than 500 masterpoints, is formally the President's Cup North American Pairs.

Each competition is a four-session matchpoint pairs tournament with two qualifying sessions on the first day and two final sessions on the second.

History

Flight A
Play for the Baldwin North American Pairs (Flight A) begins each summer at the local level and concludes at the North American Bridge Championships in the following Spring.  Qualifiers at the club level advance to unit competition and those qualifiers advance to district finals. Three pairs from each district – more, depending upon attendance – qualify for the North American final.

At inauguration, the open pairs contest was named the Grand National Pairs with 61,000 starting pairs participating in the initial local stage in August 1978 - the ultimate winners arising from the 1979 Spring NABC. The contest was renamed the North American Pairs in deference to the participation of all country members of the ACBL.

Winners have their names inscribed on the Baldwin Trophy and also receive certificates of recognition. The trophy is presented in memory of Col. Russell J. Baldwin (1889–1969), a U.S. Army officer and expert on tournament procedure who was ACBL Honorary Member of the Year in 1943. Baldwin was active as an organizer from the earliest days of contract bridge. He became a director of the American Bridge League and its treasurer shortly after its founding in 1927. He was a member of the ACBL Laws Commission and was primarily responsible for the first Duplicate Code (Laws specifically for duplicate bridge) issued in 1935. Baldwin was active as a tournament director from 1927 until 1941. After service in World War II, he was ACBL business manager from 1946 until 1951.  He was recalled to military service at the outbreak of the Korean War and retired from the U.S. Army in 1957. He rejoined ACBL in 1958 and was in charge of tournament scheduling until his retirement in 1963.

Flight B
Known as the Golder North American Pairs - Flight B, the first stage of the event is also conducted at the local club level with qualifiers advancing to unit competition. Those qualifiers then advance to the district finals where three pairs – more, depending upon attendance – qualify for the North American final. The inaugural event was held at the 1992 Spring NABC.

Winners have their names inscribed on the Golder Cup and will also receive a certificate of recognition. The trophy is presented in memory of Benjamin M. Golder (1894–1946) of Philadelphia, who died the day before the close of his term as 1946 ACBL president. He was named ACBL Honorary Member of the Year for 1947. His widow Peggy Golder, later Solomon, was an ACBL Hall of Fame player.

Flight C
Players in the North American Pairs - Flight C, compete for the President's Cup.  The inaugural event was held at the 1987 Spring NABC.

The trophy was presented in 1942 by Morgan Howard, ACBL president that year. For many years it was awarded to the winners of the President's Pairs, a standalone event at the Summer NABC. As in the other two flights, Flight C competition begins each summer at the local club level and qualifiers advance to unit and district competitions with three pairs from each district – more, depending upon attendance – qualifying for the North American final.

Winners

See also
Grand National Teams

References

External links
 NAP – North American Pairs at ACBL.org (May 23, 2014)
 NABC Winners: Baldwin NAP Flight A at ACBL.org
 NABC Winners Golder NAP Flight B at ACBL.org
 NABC Winners: Presidents Cup NAP Flight C at ACBL.org

North American Bridge Championships